Zhongnan Jie Station is the Eastern terminus station of Line 1, Suzhou Rail Transit. The station is located in Suzhou Industrial Park of Suzhou. It has been in use since April 28, 2012, the same time of the preoperation of Line 1.

References

Railway stations in Jiangsu
Suzhou Rail Transit stations
Suzhou Industrial Park
Railway stations in China opened in 2012